Valley Center is a city in Sedgwick County, Kansas, United States, and a suburb of Wichita.  As of the 2020 census, the population of the city was 7,340.

History
Valley Center was incorporated on September 29, 1885, and was named for its location in the valley of the Arkansas River.

On the morning of July 17, 2007, a large explosion occurred at the Barton Solvents chemical plant in Valley Center, destroying the plant and forcing the temporary evacuation of the city.  Cleanup began several weeks later, and the investigation was completed by mid-August.

Geography
Valley Center is located at  (37.829719, -97.369341).

Valley Center is located two miles west of combined Interstate 135, U.S. Route 81, and K-15.

Demographics

Valley Center is part of the Wichita, KS Metropolitan Statistical Area.

2010 census
As of the census of 2010, there were 6,822 people, 2,484 households, and 1,862 families living in the city. The racial makeup of the city was 94.2% White, 0.8% African American, 0.8% Native American, 0.4% Asian, 1.3% from other races, and 2.5% from two or more races. Hispanic or Latino of any race were 4.6% of the population.

There were 2,484 households, of which 42.6% had children under the age of 18 living with them, 58.5% were married couples living together, 11.0% had a female householder with no husband present, 5.5% had a male householder with no wife present, and 25.0% were non-families. 22.6% of all households were made up of individuals, and 9.3% had someone living alone who was 65 years of age or older. The average household size was 2.75 and the average family size was 3.22.

The median age in the city was 34.3 years. 31.4% of residents were under the age of 18; 7.1% were between the ages of 18 and 24; 26.3% were from 25 to 44; 23.8% were from 45 to 64; and 11.4% were 65 years of age or older. The gender makeup of the city was 49.5% male and 50.5% female.

2000 census
As of the census of 2000, there were 4,883 people, 1,761 households, and 1,368 families living in the city. The racial makeup of the city was 96.78% White, 0.33% African American, 0.55% Native American, 0.37% Asian, 0.70% from other races, and 1.27% from two or more races. Hispanic or Latino of any race were 2.25% of the population.

There were 1,761 households, out of which 40.6% had children under the age of 18 living with them, 64.2% were married couples living together, 9.9% had a female householder with no husband present, and 22.3% were non-families. 19.9% of all households were made up of individuals, and 9.6% had someone living alone who was 65 years of age or older. The average household size was 2.72 and the average family size was 3.13.

In the city, the population was spread out, with 29.4% under the age of 18, 7.7% from 18 to 24, 28.9% from 25 to 44, 21.8% from 45 to 64, and 12.3% who were 65 years of age or older. The median age was 35 years. For every 100 females, there were 95.0 males. For every 100 females age 18 and over, there were 92.8 males.

The median income for a household in the city was $50,683, and the median income for a family was $56,667. Males had a median income of $42,917 versus $26,639 for females. The per capita income for the city was $20,259. About 1.0% of families and 2.3% of the population were below the poverty line, including 1.3% of those under age 18 and 1.9% of those age 65 or over.

Education
Valley Center USD 262 employs approximately 370 people and serves more than 2,760 children from the communities of Valley Center, Park City, Kechi, and Wichita. The schools include one Pre-K - 3 building, two K-3 schools, an intermediate school that houses the fourth and fifth grades, a sixth, seventh and eighth grade middle school, and a high school. There is also an alternative school, The Learning Center, which assists students of all ages earning their high school diploma. The Valley Center school district mascot is the Hornets.

Events
 Fall Festival - Annual event in September.

Notable people
Notable individuals who were born in and/or have lived in Valley Center include:
 Cady Groves (1989-2020), pop-country singer
 Patrick Miller (1980-), U.S. Army Staff Sergeant, prisoner of war

See also
 Arkansas Valley Interurban Railway

References

Further reading

External links

 City of Valley Center
 Valley Center - Directory of Public Officials
 Valley Center city map, KDOT

Cities in Kansas
Cities in Sedgwick County, Kansas
Wichita, KS Metropolitan Statistical Area
Populated places established in 1885